Barry Leonard O'Rourke (born 17 November 1963) is an Australian politician. He has been the Labor member for Rockhampton in the Queensland Legislative Assembly since 2017.

Career

Following the unexpected retirement of Labor MP Bill Byrne for health reasons, O'Rourke contested Labor preselection for Byrne's seat of Rockhampton. His main opponent was Margaret Strelow, the mayor of Rockhampton, who was endorsed by the Premier, Annastacia Palaszczuk. On 27 October 2017, O'Rourke defeated Strelow, who subsequently announced she would contest the election as an independent.

At the November state election, O'Rourke was elected to succeed Byrne as the member for Rockhampton. Strelow recorded 23.5% of the vote and was second on the initial count, but Liberal National preferences pushed the One Nation candidate ahead of her and O'Rourke was elected on Strelow's preferences.

References

Parliamentary Profile

1963 births
Living people
Members of the Queensland Legislative Assembly
Australian Labor Party members of the Parliament of Queensland
21st-century Australian politicians